A prosleptic syllogism (from Greek πρόσληψις proslepsis "taking in addition") is a class of syllogisms that use a prosleptic proposition as one of the premises.

The term originated with Theophrastus.

Figures
Prosleptic syllogisms are classified in three figures, or potential arrangements of the terms according to the figure of the prosleptic proposition used.
 First figure: "A is universally predicated of everything that is universally predicated of G"
 Second figure: "Everything predicated universally of A is predicated universally of G"
 Third figure: "A is universally predicated of everything of which G is universally predicated"
Consequently, a third figure prosleptic syllogism would read "A is universally affirmed of everything of which G is universally affirmed; G is universally affirmed of B; therefore, A is universally affirmed of B." ("All G are A; all B are G; therefore, all B are A" or "Statement A is always true of everything for which statement G is always true; statement G is true of all things B; therefore, statement A is true of all things B.")

Notes

References
 William & Martha Kneale, Prosleptic Propositions and Arguments, in M. S. Stern, Albert Hourani, Vivian Brown (eds.), Islamic Philosophy and the Classical Tradition, London: Bruno Cassireer, 1972, pp. 189-207.

Arguments
Term logic
Syllogism